The Women's 200m event at the 2010 South American Games was held on March 21, 2010, with the heats at 10:30 and the Final at 18:35.

Medalists

Records

Results
Results were published.

Heats

Heat 1

Heat 2

Final

See also
2010 South American Under-23 Championships in Athletics

References

External links
Heat 1 
Heat 2 
Final

200W